This is a list of the men's national association football teams in the world. There are more nations with football teams than for any other sport, with teams representing 191 of the 193 UN member states, as well as several dependent territories, sub-national entities, and states that are not members of the United Nations. This list divides teams into three main groups:

 Teams that are either members of Fédération Internationale de Football Association (FIFA), the world's football governing body (211 teams), or have membership in a FIFA-affiliated continental confederation without being members of FIFA (11 teams).
 Teams that are not members of FIFA or any continental federation, but which represent sovereign states. This group includes United Nations members and observer states, as well as states that are not members of the UN (11 teams).

This list excludes other teams, which generally play outside FIFA's recognition. Excluded teams include those who represent ethnic groups, sub-national entities, separatist movements, and pseudo- or micro-nations.

Members of FIFA affiliated confederations 

This section lists the current:

 211 men's national football teams affiliated to FIFA, through their national football associations.
 11 men's national football teams who have membership in one of FIFA's affiliated continental confederations, but are not members of FIFA.

FIFA members are eligible to enter the FIFA World Cup and matches between them are recognized as official international matches. Based on their match results over the previous four-year period, the FIFA Men's World Rankings, published monthly by FIFA, compare the relative strengths of the national teams.

Some national teams that are members of a confederation but not FIFA members compete in confederation-level and subregional tournaments. These teams, however, are not allowed to participate in the World Cup.

The six confederations are:

 Asia – Asian Football Confederation (AFC) 
 Africa – Confederation of African Football (CAF)
 North and Central America and the Caribbean – Confederation of North, Central America and Caribbean Association Football (CONCACAF)
 South America – South American Football Confederation (CONMEBOL)
 Oceania – Oceania Football Confederation (OFC)
 Europe – Union of European Football Associations (UEFA)

FIFA runs the World Cup as a tournament for national teams to find the world champion. Each confederation also runs its own championship to find the best team from among its members:

AFC – AFC Asian Cup
CAF – Africa Cup of Nations
CONCACAF – CONCACAF Gold Cup
CONMEBOL – Copa América
OFC – OFC Nations Cup
UEFA – UEFA European Football Championship

The Union of Arab Football Associations (UAFA) contains Arab League member nations outside of the confederations structure. All 22 national governing bodies that form UAFA are also members of both FIFA and either the AFC or CAF. National teams from UAFA member countries are noted in the list below. The Arab Cup is the top championship tournament for national teams, organized historically by UAFA and by FIFA in 2021.

The Confederation of Independent Football Associations (ConIFA) is an organization for teams representing unrecognised states, subnational regions, and stateless minorities, as well as teams from recognised states that have not managed to gain entry into FIFA. ConIFA is a successor to the Nouvelle Fédération-Board (N.F.-Board), which also organized tournaments for non-FIFA member teams. While none of the current ConIFA members are also members of FIFA, a few hold associate membership in one of the confederations affiliated with it. These teams are also noted in the list below. The ConIFA World Football Cup is the top tournament for ConIFA member nations.

AFC (Asia) 
Due to the geographical size of Asia, the AFC is subdivided into five sub-federations:

West Asian Football Federation (WAFF) – represents countries at the western extremity of the continent, except Israel.
East Asian Football Federation (EAFF) – represents nations in East Asia, plus Guam and the Northern Mariana Islands.
Central Asian Football Association (CAFA) – represents countries in Central Asia, comprising Afghanistan, Iran, and most of Soviet Central Asia, except Kazakhstan.
South Asian Football Federation (SAFF) – represents countries in South Asia.
ASEAN Football Federation (AFF) – represents countries in Southeast Asia, plus Australia.

 
 National governing body was formerly a member of OFC (1966–2006)
 National governing body is a member of UAFA
 Official name used by FIFA and AFC for People's Republic of China 
 Official name used by FIFA and AFC for Republic of China (Taiwan); national governing body was a member of OFC from 1975 to 1989
 Official name used by FIFA and AFC for Islamic Republic of Iran
 Official name used by FIFA for Democratic People's Republic of Korea; official name used by AFC is DPR Korea
 Official name used by FIFA and AFC for Republic of Korea
 Official name used by FIFA and AFC for Kyrgyzstan
 National governing body is a full member of AFC but not a FIFA member
 National governing body was formerly a member of OFC (2005–2009)
 Official name used by FIFA and AFC for national team representing the Palestinian Territories

CAF (Africa) 
Due to the geographical size of Africa, CAF is divided into five regional federations:

Council for East and Central Africa Football Associations (CECAFA) – represents nations generally regarded as forming the regions of East Africa and some nations of Central Africa.
Council of Southern Africa Football Associations (COSAFA) – represents nations generally regarded as forming Southern Africa, as well as island states off the coast of Southern Africa.
West African Football Union/Union du Football de l'Ouest Afrique (WAFU/UFOA) – represents nations in West Africa.
Union of North African Federations (UNAF) – represents nations regarded as forming North Africa.
Union des Fédérations du Football de l'Afrique Centrale (UNIFFAC) – represents some of the nations that form Central Africa.

 National governing body is a member of UAFA
 Official name used by FIFA for Democratic Republic of the Congo; official name used by CAF is DR Congo
 National governing body is an associate member of CAF but not a FIFA member
 National governing body was a full member of CAF briefly during 2017
 National governing body is a member of ConIFA. Was previously a member of the N.F.-Board.

CONCACAF (North, Central America, and the Caribbean) 
The CONCACAF federation is divided into three regional federations that have responsibility for part of the region's geographical area:

 Caribbean Football Union (CFU) – represents all 27 nations in the Caribbean, plus Bermuda and three nations in South America.
 North American Football Union (NAFU) – represents the three countries in North America (not including Central America).
 Union Centroamericana de Fútbol (UNCAF) – represents the seven countries in Central America.

National governing body is a full member of CONCACAF but not a FIFA member

CONMEBOL (South America)

OFC (Oceania) 

 National governing body is an associate member of the OFC but not a FIFA member
 National governing body is a member of ConIFA
 National governing body was formerly a member of AFC (1964–1966)

UEFA (Europe) 

 National governing body was formerly a member of AFC (1954–1974); joined UEFA in 1994
 National governing body was formerly a member of AFC (1993–2002)
 Suspended from participation in FIFA and UEFA competitions as a result of Russia's 2022 invasion of Ukraine
 Official name used by FIFA and UEFA for Turkey

National teams not affiliated to FIFA confederations 
The national football teams included in this section are not members of FIFA, or of any of its affiliated continental confederations. The teams are not eligible to enter the FIFA World Cup or any continental confederation championships. FIFA's statutes do not allow member teams to compete against these sides without FIFA's prior permission. Several national associations for teams included in this section are members of ConIFA; these are indicated in the lists below.

This section lists:
 7 teams representing sovereign states which are member states of the United Nations or non-member observer states with the United Nations General Assembly.
 8 teams representing states which are not members of the United Nations.

Unaffiliated United Nations states

Three UN members and one UN observer state do not have any sort of membership in FIFA or any continental federation, but have fielded national association-organised teams in unofficial friendly matches or in tournaments held outside the auspices of FIFA. Another UN member state, while being officially represented in FIFA and UEFA by the teams of its constituent nations, has also fielded a team representing the entire state in exhibition matches. The national teams of these five states are listed below.

 
 1
 2
 3
 
 National governing body is a member of ConIFA. Was previously a member of the N.F.-Board.
 Palau has been an associate member of the OFC in the past, but does not currently appear to be part of the confederation. 
 The United Kingdom is not a member of FIFA or UEFA in its own right, being represented instead by the teams of its four constituent nations (England, Northern Ireland, Scotland, and Wales). However, an exhibition UK team has played a small number of friendly matches. The UK has also been represented in the Summer Olympic and Universiade football competitions by its own national teams.  

Two UN member states (the Marshall Islands and Nauru), have never fielded a national association-organised football team.

Unaffiliated non-UN states 
Three states with limited international recognition and no UN membership are members of both FIFA and an affiliated confederation: the Republic of China (as Chinese Taipei), Kosovo, and Palestine. The Cook Islands is an associated state with no UN membership, but it is a member of both FIFA and the OFC. The national teams representing these states are all listed above.

A further eight associated, de facto, or partially recognized states with no UN membership have fielded football teams in non-FIFA football tournaments or FIFA-unsanctioned friendly matches. None of these states, however, are currently members of FIFA or any of its affiliated continental confederations. The teams representing these states are listed below.

  Abkhazia1
 1,2
 1,3
 4
 1
 1
 5
  Western Sahara1,3

 National governing body is currently a member of ConIFA.
 Previously known as Nagorno-Karabakh national football team. As of August 2021, the ConIFA world rankings designate the team as Artsakh (Nagorno-Karabakh).
 National governing body was previously a member of the N.F.-Board.
 National governing body was previously an associate member of the OFC (membership revoked in March 2021).
 National governing body was previously a member of ConIFA.

Others

Membership criteria of FIFA and affiliated confederations
Historically, the majority of FIFA and confederation members have been sovereign states with wide diplomatic recognition. Exceptions to this rule have included the British Home Nations (due to their seminal role in the development of football), Palestine (accepted into FIFA after the creation of the Palestinian National Authority), the Republic of China (which does not enjoy wide recognition but is still accepted as representative of the Taiwan area), and certain dependent territories, autonomous areas, and protectorates which, on the grounds of their political autonomy, separate status, and/or distance from their parent state, have been allowed to hold membership in FIFA and/or one of its affiliated confederations. At present, FIFA members include 23 subnational and dependent territories, as well as three states with limited international recognition. A further nine overseas, dependent, and autonomous territories with close ties to a sovereign state do not have membership in FIFA, but are members of one of its affiliated confederations (either in a full or associate capacity).

In 2016, FIFA made changes to its statutes to define 'country' as "an independent state recognized by the international community". In 2011, UEFA had already changed its statutes so that only countries recognised as independent states by the United Nations could join the organization., while CAF rescinded Zanzibar's full membership (which had been approved only months before) in 2017 on the grounds that Zanzibar is not a country as defined by the African Union and the United Nations. With some exceptions (such as the acceptances of Gibraltar and Kosovo into FIFA and UEFA in 2016), these regulations have made it harder for aspiring national associations to join FIFA or its affiliated confederations. Examples include Jersey (UEFA application rejected in 2018),
Bonaire (FIFA application rejected in 2019), and Greenland (applied to CONCACAF in 2022 due to lack of prospects of being accepted into UEFA).

Separatist, subnational, and ethnic teams

Beyond this list, a variety of teams representing dependent territories or national, separatist, sub-national, ethnic, and diaspora groups have been formed. These teams often play in international tournaments against each other, and in some cases in unsanctioned friendly games against FIFA members (for example, teams representing specific Spanish autonomous communities). Some subnational and dependent territory teams with no FIFA membership participate in regional football tournaments against FIFA or UN member nations (for example, the Mayotte and Reunion teams at the Indian Ocean Island Games or individual Micronesian state teams at the Micronesian Games).

The Confederation of Independent Football Associations (ConIFA), was founded with the aim of regularising non-FIFA international football, by having a two-year international tournament cycle, with the ConIFA World Football Cup in even numbered years, and continental tournaments in odd-numbered years. This developed the work of the now-defunct N.F.-Board (Nouvelle Fédération-Board), founded in 2001, which also organized football tournaments between FIFA-unrecognised teams. ConIFA aims to help unrecognised national teams gain recognition, but also to provide a platform for representative teams of regions or diasporas, which do not have a place in a system of international football based on nation-states. As of August 2021, 59 member associations from all over the world are affiliared with ConIFA. ConIFA is not the only body dedicated to organising football tournaments between non-FIFA national teams; other initiatives include the Island Games football tournament, the now-defunct Coupe de l'Outremer for French overseas territories, and the CSANF competitions between (mostly) South American regional and ethnic communities, among others.

Former national football teams 

These national teams no longer exist due to the dissolution of the nation or territory that they represented. Only national teams that were once members of FIFA are listed below.

New names

In addition to the above, other teams have been renamed:

 →  in 1960 →  in 1963 →  in 1971 →  in 1997
 British Gambia →  in 1965
 →  in 1966
 →  in 1989
 →  in 1970 →  in 1975 →  in 1979
 →  in 1972
 →  in 1958 until 2010
 →  in 1993
 →  in 1975
 →  in 1945
 →  in 1958 →  in 1971
 →  in 2003
 →  in 2019
 →  in 1977
 →  in 1960
 →  in 1945 →  in 1990
 →  in 1957
 →  in 1936 →  in 1954
 →  in 1983
 →  in 1929
 Madagascar →  in 1958 →  in 1975
 →  in 1948
 Middle Congo →  in 1960 →  in 1970 →  in 1992
 →  in 1980
 →  in 1964
 →  in 1966
 Portuguese Guinea →  in 1975
 →  in 1954 →  in 1980
 →  in 1964 →  in 1980
 Surinam →  in 1954
 →  in 2018
 →  in 1984
 →  in 1955
 →  in 1997

Notes

See also 

Geography of association football
List of FIFA country codes
List of women's national association football teams
List of association football competitions

References

External links